The Karakurt class, Russian designation Project 22800 Karakurt ( European Black Widow), is a new class of Russian corvettes (small missile ships in Russian classification) which have been entering service with the Russian Navy since 2018.

The class is intended as a more seaworthy, blue-water complement to the Buyan-M class corvettes, designed for the littoral zone and which  serve in Russia's Caspian Flotilla, Baltic Fleet and Black Sea Fleet.
The ships are designed to be armed with Kalibr or Oniks anti-ship cruise missiles and have an endurance of 15 days. They are also to be a cheap alternative for larger  frigates, for which construction was delayed due to the suspended military cooperation with Ukraine, and because of Russia's intention to continue the modernization of its navy until all necessary tasks for construction of larger vessels domestically are solved. Nevertheless, delays in the supply of domestically-produced engines for the Karakurt-class have held up the completion of several units. Additionally, the threat of international sanctions reportedly disrupted construction of this class of vessel at the Morye shipyard in Feodosia, Crimea.

History

Project 22800 was first publicly presented by Almaz during the International Military-Technical Forum «ARMY-2015», held in Kubinka. At the time, the class was presented yet as "Project 12300". During the exhibition, it was also announced 18 ships are planned for construction.

The first two ships, Uragan and Taifun (now Mytishchi and Sovetsk), were laid down at the Pella Shipyard in Saint Petersburg on 24 December 2015.

In August 2016, it was reported that a total of seven ships have been ordered from the Pella Shipyard (one of which would be built at More Shipyard, Feodosia), and that five more ships have been ordered from the Zelenodolsk Shipyard. Three of the five ordered ships, Cyclone, Askold and Amur, previously planned to be built by the Zelenodolsk Shipyard, were later laid down at the Zaliv Shipyard in Kerch.

On 29 July 2017, the lead ship of the class was launched.

The Russian Defence Ministry signed a contract for several more vessels during the International Military-Technical Forum «ARMY-2017».

In May 2018, it was reported Mytishchi is undergoing sea trials in Lake Ladoga and the Baltic Sea.

During the International Military-Technical Forum «ARMY-2018», the Russian Defence Ministry signed two contracts for construction of another six vessels. Two ships of the order would be built by the Vostochnaya Verf, Vladivostok and four ships by the Amur Shipyard, Komsomolsk-on-Amur.

On 16 October 2018, Mytishchi began state tests in the White Sea, and was officially accepted into service on 17 December 2018.

Design

Project 22800 derives from Project 12300 Skorpion, a proposed 1990s Almaz design for a 500-ton displacement missile boat, and was also heavily influenced by Project 21631, the Buyan-M corvettes. Ships of the class have a stealth shaped superstructure with an integrated mast carrying four phased array radar panels. The primary armament consists of Kalibr cruise missiles or P-800 Oniks supersonic anti-ship missiles carried in eight UKSK VLS cells in the rear part of the superstructure, behind the bridge. The corvettes built for the Russian Navy will be equipped with a 76.2 mm AK-176MA automatic dual-purpose gun, a modernized version of the AK-176. However, at least on the first ship, the 100 mm A-190 was installed. A proposed export version may carry the Italian OTO Melara 76 mm gun. For anti-missile defense, the first two ships will only carry a pair of AK-630M gun-based CIWS.

Starting from the third ship, they will be equipped with Pantsir-M, a navalized version of the Pantsir surface-to-air missile system. The third vessel of the class, Odintsovo, entered service in the Baltic Fleet with the Pantsir-M system in November 2020. The project 22800 is not designed for anti-submarine warfare.

Ships

Italics indicate estimates

Controversy

In November 2022, an arbitration court in Moscow held the first preliminary hearing for a lawsuit against Pella Shipyard (Pella) of St Petersburg, in which the Russian Defence Ministry is seeking 1.4 billion Rubles (US$23.1 million) over allegations the company was “failing to fulfill supply contracts.”

References

External links
Project 22800 Karakurt-Class Corvettes
Project 22800 - Complete Ship List

Corvette classes
Corvettes of Russia
Stealth ships